Jeremiah Clayton "Jeremy" Davis (born February 8, 1985), also known as Jerm, is an American musician, songwriter, and rapper. He was the bassist for the rock band Paramore until his departure in December 2015.

Early life
In 2002, at the age of 17, he was living in Franklin, Tennessee, where he played in a funk cover band called The Factory, where he met Hayley Williams. Through Williams, Davis met the other members, brothers Josh Farro and Zac Farro, then forming Paramore. Davis admitted that due to Zac's age (only 14 at the time) he thought people wouldn't take them seriously until he saw him play.

Paramore

Paramore was created in Franklin, Tennessee in 2004 by the two brothers Josh Farro (lead guitar/backing vocals) and Zac Farro (drums). Taylor York was also a part of the band from the very beginning, but his parents wanted him to finish school first and later returned in 2007. Later, they asked Hayley Williams (lead vocals/keyboards) to join the band, and through Hayley, Jeremy Davis (bass guitar) joined as well. In 2005, John Janick, founder of record label Fueled by Ramen, signed a contract with them. Prior to forming Paramore, the other members of what was soon to be Paramore had been "edgy about the whole female thing" of having Williams as singer, but as they were good friends, she began writing with them, and eventually became a member.

The band was eventually signed to a deal on Fueled by Ramen. The band released their first album, All We Know Is Falling, without him. For this time, Davis was replaced by John Hembree. He rejoined soon afterwards and was present on the band's second album, Riot!. Davis also plays bass on the live albums The Final Riot! and Live in the UK. The band's third album, Brand New Eyes, was released on September 29, 2009. Their fourth album, Paramore, was released in 2013. In 2014, Davis was nominated for Best Bassist at the Alternative Press Music Awards.

It was announced on December 14, 2015, that Davis would no longer be in the band, and that Paramore would continue as a duo.

In February 2016, Davis became embroiled in a legal battle with Williams and Taylor York over ownership and authorship of the songs and a portion of the royalties from Paramore's self-titled album, as well as a share of the band's touring revenue and other income. Davis claimed Varoom Whoa, the business entity that operates Paramore, was a partnership, and that Williams and York are also partners. The business denied this, claiming Williams and York are employees (York also admitted this himself), that Davis was paid what he earned during his time in the band, and that while Williams is the only one signed to Atlantic Records, she shared her personal earnings with the band out of a sense of camaraderie.

Other work
Davis co-produced and played bass on the B.o.B. song "Violet Vibrato", released in 2015. Davis launched a record label named Post Trap Entertainment in October 2020.

On May 7, 2021, Davis released his solo debut album, Grand Ole Opportunity.

Personal life
Davis dated Sarah Orzechowski for multiple years. On September 30, 2011, he married British actress Kathryn Camsey. The couple's first child, Bliss Belle Buttercup Davis, was born on December 28, 2013.

References

External links

Bio at Paramore.net

Living people
People from North Little Rock, Arkansas
American rock bass guitarists
American male bass guitarists
Paramore members
Guitarists from Arkansas
1985 births
American male guitarists
21st-century American bass guitarists